Grosvenor Gardens Apartments is a historic apartment complex located at Raleigh, Wake County, North Carolina.  The three buildings were built in 1935, and are three-story, Colonial Revival style brick buildings arranged in a “U” shape plan around an open landscaped courtyard.  It is a pedimented gable-roofed structure with symmetrically arranged three- and five bay units, three of which feature two-story convex porticos facing the center courtyard.  There are 58 efficiency units, one basement apartment with one bedroom, one two-bedroom apartment, one three-bedroom apartment, and a laundry room in the complex.

It was listed on the National Register of Historic Places in 1992.

References

Residential buildings on the National Register of Historic Places in North Carolina
Colonial Revival architecture in North Carolina
Residential buildings completed in 1939
Buildings and structures in Raleigh, North Carolina
National Register of Historic Places in Raleigh, North Carolina